Linuche is a genus of cnidarians belonging to the family Linuchidae.

The species of this genus are found in America and Southeastern Asia.

Species:

Liniscus cyamopterus 
Liniscus ornithopterus 
Liniscus sandalopterus 
Linuche aquila 
Linuche lamarckii 
Linuche unguiculata 
Linuche vesiculata

References

Scyphozoan genera
Linuchidae